is a Japanese manga series by Atsuko Takakura serialized in the seinen manga magazine Evening, published by Kodansha. A Japanese television drama adaptation aired on Fuji Television  channels. The manga did not sell well until the television series began.

Working at a department store, Megumi Aoyagi (wall woman) is a career woman who is popular at her workplace. However, she carries an inferiority complex with regard to her flat chest. One day, a well endowed, well proportioned lady known as Marie Mariya (mountain woman) appears before her. In the middle of the episode, these two characters found friendship in each other.

Marie Mariya (mountain woman), although found strange by her co-workers for her big appetite and cheerful personality, Marie has an extraordinary way to pacify and please a dissatisfied customer. While Megumi Aoyagi (wall woman), saves the day with her smarts in making the sale.

With breasts and personalities at opposites of each other, despite the rivalry that emerged between the two, but,  the multitudes of difficulties that lie in their paths won't get them down as they cheerfully and diligently go about their work and love life.

Live-action television series
The live action series starring Kyoko Fukada as Marie Mariya and Misaki Ito as Megumi Aoyagi started airing on Fuji TV on July 5, 2007, and ran for 12 episodes.

External links
 

2005 manga
Seinen manga
Japanese drama television series
2007 Japanese television series debuts
2007 Japanese television series endings
Fuji TV dramas